Beckers is an occupational surname, especially common in both Dutch and Belgian Limburg and the neighboring part of Germany. It is equivalent to the English Baker, Dutch Bakker and Backer, and German Becker.

Geographical distribution
As of 2014, 38.8% of all known bearers of the surname Beckers were residents of Germany (frequency 1:8,918), 29.7% of Belgium (1:1,669), 22.0% of the Netherlands (1:3,308), 3.9% of the United States (1:401,837) and 1.1% of France (1:252,880).

In Belgium, the frequency of the surname was higher than national average (1:1,669) only in one region:
 1. Flemish Region (1:1,492)

In the Netherlands, the frequency of the surname was higher than national average (1:3,308) only in one province:
 1. Limburg (1:379)

In Germany, the frequency of the surname was higher than national average (1:8,918) only in one state:
 1. North Rhine-Westphalia (1:2,328)

People
Betty Beckers (1925–1982), French actress
Hubert Beckers (1806–1889), German philosopher
Jacques Beckers (b. 1934), Dutch-born American astrophysicist
Jürgen Beckers (b. 1964), German cabaret performer and comedian
Marc Beckers (b. 1973), German footballer
Paul Beckers (1878–1965), German actor
:fr:Pierre Beckers (1885–1968), Belgian politician
Pierre-Olivier Beckers (b. 1960), Belgian businessman
Ria Beckers (1938–2006), Dutch Green politician

See also
 Becker, a common German surname
 Paige Bueckers (born 2001), American basketball player whose surname is pronounced "Beckers"

References

Dutch-language surnames
German-language surnames
Occupational surnames

de:Beckers